Hardship may refer to:

Hardship clause, in contract law
Hardship post, in a foreign service
Extreme hardship, in immigration law
Undue hardship, in employment law and other areas